The Sardinian Shepherd Dog or Fonni's Dog ( or) is an ancient landrace breed of Sardinian dog used as a herding, catching, and livestock guardian dog.

Although there are depictions dating back to at least the mid-19th century, it is not recognized by the Fédération Cynologique Internationale. It has gained a recognition of the Alianza Canina Latina.

The breed, which is indigenous to the island, was founded with approximately 170 specimens gathered from rural parts of inner Sardinia. The breed is, therefore, a landrace. Because of the large number of founders and the breed's genetic variability, the breed should enjoy relative freedom from genetic inbreeding. Most of the dog breeds are derived by a very small number of founders (for example, nine dogs were used as founders of the Siberian Husky) and therefore inbreeding tends to be high, resulting in a high incidence of illness due to gene mutations.

Appearance
The dog has a rough coat, which can be grey, black, brindle, brown or white. Height at the withers is about 56 to 60 cm for males, while females are a couple of centimeters shorter. A typical characteristic of the breed is the fiery expression of the eyes, whose position, unlike other dog breeds, is totally frontal, giving the dog a unique "monkey-like" appearance.

Variability observed between individuals is likely due to the lack of selective pressures. There are, however, consistently strong commonalities across dogs from different locations, including characteristics such as amber eye color and the characteristic "monkey-like face". The coat, irrespective of color, has a typical coarse outer layer, as well as a woolly and dense undercoat. The hair on the head and hindquarters is typically short, while the face has longer furnishings around the eyes and a beard-like length around the muzzle and chin. Male dogs have a longer and thicker coat around the neck forming a mane.

Approximately 15% of individuals are short-coated, and this is generally selected against in favor of the long-coated variety. Approximately 30% of individuals have a natural bobtail.

History
In 2016, a genomic study revealed that Fonni's Dog is associated with sighthound and molossoid breeds from the eastern and southern Mediterranean. The genomic map of these dogs is able to mirror human migration to the island from the Middle East and northern Africa.

See also
 Dogs portal
 List of dog breeds

Citations

References
Cane Fonnese

External links
PASTORE FONNESE-VIDEO

Dog landraces
Dog breeds originating in Italy
Fauna of Sardinia
Livestock guardian dogs
Herding dogs
Rare dog breeds